Alexander Meduna (born 1957 in Olomouc, Czech Republic) is a theoretical computer scientist and expert on compiler design, formal languages and automata. He is a professor of Computer Science at the Brno University of Technology. Formerly, he taught theoretical computer science at various European and American universities, including the University of Missouri, where he spent a decade teaching advanced topics of formal language theory. He is the author of several books and over sixty papers related to the subject matter.

Meduna is also an artist, who is primarily interested in visual art. He had several exhibitions in the USA and Europe. He often performs poetry reading as well.

Publications

References

External links
 Official website
 Publications at DBLP Database
 Springer Link
 Author Page on Amazon.com

Living people
Czech computer scientists
Theoretical computer scientists
1957 births